Dehiwala-Mount Lavinia, population 245,974 (2012) is the largest suburb of Colombo, and covers an extent of . It lies south of the Colombo Municipal Council area and separated from it by the Dehiwala canal which forms the northern boundary of DMMC. Its southern limits lie in Borupana Road and the eastern boundary is Weras Ganga with its canal system and including some areas to its east (Pepiliyana, Gangodawila and Kohuwala). This town has extensive population and rapid industrialisation and urbanization in recent years. It is home to Sri Lanka's National Zoological Gardens, which remains one of Asia's largest. Colombo South Teaching Hospital, Kalubowila and Colombo Airport, Ratmalana are some important landmark in this area. Dehiwela-Mount Lavinia and Sri Jayawardenapura Kotte being two large suburban centres of the city of Colombo function together as one large urban agglomeration in the Region (Western Province). The overspill from the City in residential and commercial uses of land have rapidly urbanised these suburban centers. Dehiwela-Mount Lavinia and Sri Jayawardenpaura along with Colombo Municipal Council form the most urbanised part of the core area of the Colombo Metropolitan Region. Dehiwala and Mount Lavinia lie along the Galle Road artery, which runs along the coast to the south of the country.

Etymology 
There are many stories about the history of this area. One of those is Diya Wala which means a dip or hole filled with water. In past this area consists full of ponds, lakes thus it became known as Diyawala (an area filled with water) and later on it became Dehiwala. Another story in this name regard is that this area has many trees of lime or a forest of lime trees and people call it Dehiwala. It is told that king of Kotte filled all his lime requirements from this area.

History 
Before colonisation of the maritime region by the Portuguese, the area covered by the present DMMC was part of the Kingdom of Kotte. It comprised a number of villages such as Pepiliyana Nedimala, Attidiya and Kalubowila, while Ratmalana and areas south of Dehiwala were together one large expanse of marshland, and scarcely populated.

Portuguese era 
During the Portuguese occupation, the Kingdom of Kotte was ruled by king Don Juan Dharmapala, and it encompassed the above-mentioned villages. Early records also indicate that in the year 1510 AD the village of “Galkissa” is mentioned and named after the rocky mound (Lihiniyagala) protruding into the Bay. Fascinating tales are woven round this rock and the village “Galkissa”. The Dutch invaders called the mound “the pregnant wench”.

Dutch era 
With the arrival of the Dutch in the early seventeenth century, a more organised administrative structure was in place, whereby a broad based taxation and legal system evolved.

British era 
However, it was only during British occupation (19th Century) that a Provincial administrative (Kachcheri) system and a form of Local Government developed. When the second Governor of Ceylon, Sir Thomas Maitland, acquired land at "Galkissa" (Mount Lavinia) and decided in 1806 to construct a personal residence there. Maitland fell in love with Lovina Aponsuwa, a local mestiço dancer, and continued a romantic affair with her until he was recalled to England in 1811. The Governor's mansion, which he named "Mount Lavinia House" is now the Mount Lavinia Hotel and the village that surrounded the building has subsequently developed into a bustling area, taking its name from the Governor's mistress, Lovina.  Later, the area assumed the name of Mount Lavinia alluding to the factual story of a romance between the then British Governor Thomas Maitland (1805–1812) and a dancing girl called Lovina of the area.

After Independence 
Dehiwela, Mount Lavinia attained Municipal status in December 1959. Dehiwela Mount Lavinia as a Local body of 6 wards extending over a land extent of only 16.3 km2. Due to rapid urban growth and for administrative reasons this area was extended and divided into 19 wards in 1959 and given Municipal status.

Geography 
As the Dehiwala-Mount Lavinia area lies on the coastal plain the land is mostly flat and undulating towards the inland areas. A significant feature is the large extent of wetlands around the Weras Ganga (river) and Bolgoda Lake the two major water bodies. The Bellanwila and Attidiya marshes are noteworthy for their bio-diversity and as such are considered as an ecological protected zone. Lying in the wet zone, the Dehiwala-Mount Lavinia area receives an average annual rainfall between  mainly during the south west monsoon and the intermonsoon periods.

Zones 
Dehiwala-Mount Lavinia is a suburb of Colombo Metropolitan Region. Its Municipality comprises the following areas.
Dehiwala
Mount-Lavinia
Attidiya
Kalubowila
Kohuwala
Nedimala
Ratmalana

Demographics 
Dehiwala-Mount Lavinia Municipality area is a multi-religious, multi-ethnic, multi-cultural city.

Religious Places

Buddhist Temples 
Bellanwila Rajamaha Viharaya is a Buddhist temple situated in Bellanwila, Colombo District, Sri Lanka. Located around 12 km south to the Colombo city, near Dehiwala–Maharagama road, the temple attracts hundreds of devotees daily and is famous for its annual Esala Perehera festival which usually takes place in the month of August or September. One of the most venerated Buddhist temples in Sri Lanka.
Nawa Polonnaru Gal Viharaya – Kanumuldeniye Sri Dharmashoka Thero, the construction of replicas of all the statues of the Gal Viharaya, Polonnaruwa that started in 1982, has been completed by now. The opening of the Samadhi Buddha statue coincides with the 2600 Sambuddhatwa Jayanthi celebrations. Those Buddha statues are constructed at the Nawa Polonnaru Gal Viahraya, Dehiwala following the original scale of the statue at the Gal Viharaya, Polonnaruwa and were declared open by Former President Mahinda Rajapaksa.

Hindu Temples 

 Sri Venkateshwara MAHA Vishnu Moorthy Kovil is next to Nedimala and is located in Dehiwala.
 Sri Anjaneyar Kovil is located in the Dehiwala-Mount lavinia area of Colombo. It is about 30–45 mins from the main area of Colombo.
 Sri Muthumari Amman Thiru Kovil, Abeysekara Rd Dehiwala-Mount Lavinia, Total distance main road from to kovil  802.89m

Churches 
 St. Mary's Church – On September 13, 1834, six Catholic laymen from the congregation of St. Sylvester's church, now St. Anthony's Church, Galkissa came to Dehiwala in search of a piece of land to build a church. A devout Catholic, Muhandiram B. Bastian Mendis gifted them half an acre of land. The foundation stone was laid and on February 4, 1835 the church was dedicated to Our Lady of Good Voyage, says one of the Jubilee Secretaries Nigel de Lile.
 Christ Church, Galkissa – According to the historian Valentyn, the earliest reference to a church in Galkissa is in 1705 when there was a pretty good church, roofed with tiles and built upon 10 masonry and 20 stone pillars, taken from the heathen temple of Pepiliyana with a wall of clay three and a half feet high. With the main entrance from Galle Road, when the Rev. Felix Dias Abeysinghe was Vicar, the main door of the Church was opened, never to be closed again on 6 June 1959, and Christ Church, Galkissa became the “Church of the open door.”

Mosques 
 Muhiyadeen Grand Jumu'ah Mosque (Dehiwala Grand Mosque)- The largest Mosque located in Dehiwala-Mount Lavinia Area.
 Dehiwala Town Jummah Masjid
 Zainab Jummah Masjid
 Bilal Masjid
 Gazzali Masjid
 Kawdana Jummah Masjid
 Masjid-Ul-Hiba(Attidiya)
 Masjid Dharul Taqwa
 Majid Dharus Shafie
 Masjid AL-Azhar
 Abu Backar Dawaah center
 Rathmalana Jummah Masjid

Attractions 

 National Zoological Gardens of Sri Lanka (also called Colombo Zoo or Dehiwala Zoo) is a zoological garden in Dehiwala, Sri Lanka, founded in 1936. Its sprawling areas are host to a variety of animals and birds. The zoo exhibits animals but also places an emphasis on animal conservation and welfare, and education.
 Mount Lavinia Beach is Sri Lanka's main sea-bathing spot. Here, depending on season, the waves can be swimmable and it'\ is host to some amazing sunsets. The waters are swimmable only at certain times of the year and can be very rough, with undertow. From there you can cross the rail-tracks, past the three-legged dog and Golden Mile restaurant, and you're on the beach. Among the things that are sold there are swimsuits, inflatable balls, sour mango, and manioca chips. The strip also boasts of high-end restaurants like Lavinia Breeze, Long Feng, Steamboat, Belize, etc.
 The Sri Lanka Air Force Museum (SLAF Museum) is the museum of the Sri Lanka Air Force, and its predecessor, the Royal Ceylon Air Force. Open to the public, the museum is at the SLAF Ratmalana and is maintained by the Sri Lanka Air Force. Notable items include the medals and sword of Air Vice Marshal E. R. Amarasekara, the first Ceylonese Commander of the Air Force. The museum also has remnants of Japanese aircraft shot down over Ceylon during World War 2 and artifacts from the LTTE aircraft shot down during the Suicide Air Raid on Colombo. An Austin Fire Fighting Vehicle and a Shorland armoured car used by the Sri Lanka Air Force is exhibited as well.
  Attidiya Bird Sanctuary, just outside Colombo, lie the marshy lands of Attidiya Bird Sanctuary. Bordering the famous Bellanwila Buddhist Temple; the sanctuary has rich and diverse birdlife, despite its comparatively smaller area. The Attidiya Bird Sanctuary is well known for its migratory and endemic water birds; but is also a great place to watch butterflies.

Government and law enforcement 
Dehiwala-Mount Lavinia is a suburb of Colombo Metropolitan Area, with a Municipal Council form of government. Dehiwala-Mount Lavinia's mayor and the council members are elected through local government elections held once in five years. The city government provides sewer, road management and waste management services, water, electricity and telephone utility services the council liaises with the road development authority, water supply and drainage board, the Ceylon electricity board and telephone service providers.

There are 2 Divisional Secretary in the Dehiwala-Mount Lavinia area
 Dehiwala Divisional Secretariat
 Ratmalana Divisional Secretariat
The Sri Lanka Police the main law enforcement agency of the island liaise with the municipal council, but is under the control of the Ministry of Defence of the central government. As with most Sri Lankan cities, the magistrate court handles felony crimes, the district court handles civil cases. There are 3 police stations within the Dehiwala-Mount Lavinia area
 Dehiwala Police Station
 Mount Lavinia Police Station
 Kohuwala Police Station

Transport

Bus 
Colombo has an extensive public transport system based on buses operated both by private operators and the government-owned Sri Lanka Transport Board (SLTB). The primary bus terminals within the Dehiwala-Mount Lavinia — Dehiwala Bus Terminal, Mount Lavinia Bus Terminal and Ratmalana Bus Terminal handle local services.

Rail 

Train transport in the city is limited since most trains are meant for transport to and from the city rather than within it and are often overcrowded. Dehiwala-Mount Lavinia situated in the Coastal Line of Sri Lanka Railway which runs from Colombo towards Matara.

Road 
The road network in Dehiwala and Mount Lavinia consists of three classes of roads. Dehiwala and Mount Lavinia lie along the Galle Road artery in the West of the city, which runs along the coast to the south of the country. It is the gateway to the Colombo Metro City from the Southern part of Sri Lanka.
 A2 highway connects Colombo with Galle and Matara
 B84 highway connects Colombo with Horana
 Hill Street connects Dehiwala With Boralesgamuwa and Maharagama
 Hospital Road connects with Nugegoda
 Marine Drive

Air 
Ratmalana Airport is the city's airport, located 15 km (9.3 mi) south of the Colombo city centre and 2 km from Dehiwala junction. It commenced operating in 1935 and was the country's first international airport until it was replaced by Bandaranaike Airport in 1967. Ratmalana Airport now primarily services domestic flights, aviation training and international corporate flights.

Other 
Other means of transport includes  the taxis.These cab services are run by private companies and are metered.

Education 

Education institutions in Colombo have a long history. Dehiwala-Mount Lavinia has many of the prominent public schools in the country, some of them government-owned and others private. Certain urban schools of Sri Lanka have some religious alignment; this is partly due to the influence of British who established Christian missionary schools. Colombo has many International Schools that have come up in the recent years.

Schools 
S. Thomas' College, Mount Lavinia
Holy Family Convent, Dehiwela
Methodist College, Dehiwala
Girls High School, Mount Lavinia
Hejaaz International School, Mount Lavinia
Alethea International, Dehiwala
Presbyterian Girls School, Dehiwala
Colombo Hindu College, Ratmalana
St. Mary's College, Dehiwala
Central College, Dehiwala
Science College, Mount Lavinia
Buddhist Girls' College, Mount Lavinia
Gateway International School, Dehiwala
Lalith Athulathmudali College, Mount Lavinia
Lead The Way Girls’ International School
Mount Royal International School

Higher Educational Centres 
Advanced Technological Institute, Waidya Road, Dehiwala
Vocational Training Centre, Dehiwala
General Sir John Kotelawala Defence University
Technical College, Ratmalana
Civil Aviation Training Center
BCAS Mount Campus
Metropolitan College
Lanka Bible College & Seminary

Notable residents 
See :Category:People from Dehiwala-Mount Lavinia

References 

 
Populated places in Western Province, Sri Lanka